Suvorovskaya (Moscow Metro)
 Suvorovskaya, Volgograd Oblast
 Suvorovskaya Square
 Suvorov Square (Moscow)